John Brown "Joe" Caven (born 11 October 1936) is a Scottish former footballer, best known for playing with Greenock Morton and Airdrieonians in the Scottish Football League. He was a centre forward.

Born in Kirkintilloch, Caven also played for Airdrie, Brighton & Hove Albion, Raith Rovers, Greenock Morton, and Stirling Albion, with a short time in South Africa playing for Addington and Germiston Callies.

Having been given a free transfer by Raith Rovers at the end of the 1962–63 season, in July 1963, Caven signed for Inverness Caledonian, a Highland Football League club at that time, on the basis that if a Scottish League club came along for him he would be released from his contract by Inverness Caledonian. Within weeks after signing for Inverness Caledonian, Greenock Morton signed Joe and therefore he never appeared for Inverness Caledonian in the Highland Football League. Caven now lives in Nairn, near Inverness, in the North of Scotland.

External links

References

Living people
1936 births
Sportspeople from Kirkintilloch
Scottish footballers
Association football forwards
Scottish Football League players
English Football League players
Scottish expatriate sportspeople in South Africa
Scottish expatriate footballers
Airdrieonians F.C. (1878) players
Brighton & Hove Albion F.C. players
Raith Rovers F.C. players
Greenock Morton F.C. players
Stirling Albion F.C. players
Addington F.C. players
National Football League (South Africa) players
Germiston Callies F.C. players